The non-marine molluscs of Sierra Leone are a part of the molluscan fauna of Sierra Leone.

A number of species of non-marine molluscs are found in the wild in Sierra Leone.

Freshwater gastropods 
Freshwater gastropods in Sierra Leone include:
Ampullariidae
 Saulea vitrea (Born, 1778)

Bithyniidae
 Sierraia leonensis Connolly, 1929
 Sierraia whitei D.S. Brown, 1988

Hemisinidae
 Pachymelania byronensis (W. Wood, 1828)

Bulinidae
 Bulinus forskalii (Ehrenberg, 1831)
 Bulinus globosus (Morelet, 1866)
 Bulinus senegalensis O.F. Müller, 1781

Lymnaeidae
 Radix natalensis (Krauss, 1848)

Land gastropods 
Land gastropods in Sierra Leone include:

Maizaniidae
 Maizaniella leonensis (Morelet, 1873)

Urocyclidae
 Granularion atromaculatus Van Mol, 1970
 Granularion lomaensis Van Mol, 1970
 Granularion marmoratus Van Mol, 1970
 Granularion paratenuis Van Mol, 1970
 Granularion tenuis Van Mol, 1970
 Verrucarion demeryi de Winter, 1987

Freshwater bivalves
Freshwater bivalves in Sierra Leone include:

Donacidae
 Galatea paradoxa (Born, 1778)

Etheriidae
 Etheria elliptica Lamarck, 1807

Iridinidae
 Pleiodon ovatus (Swainson, 1823)

Unionidae
 Coelatura aegyptiaca (Cailliaud, 1827)

See also

Lists of molluscs of surrounding countries:
 List of non-marine molluscs of Guinea, Wildlife of Guinea
 List of non-marine molluscs of Liberia, Wildlife of Liberia

References

Molluscs
Sierra Leone
Sierra Leone